The 2012 League of Ireland Cup Final also known as the 2012 EA Sports Cup Final was the final match of the 2012 League of Ireland Cup, the 39th season of the League of Ireland Cup, a football competition for the 27 teams from the Premier Division, First Division, A Championship and the Ulster Senior League. 

The final was played on Saturday, 22 September 2012 in Tallaght Stadium, Dublin.
The match was televised live by Setanta Sports.
If the scores were level after 90 minutes of play, then extra-time of 30 minutes duration would have been played, followed by a penalty shoot-out, if required to determine the winners of the cup.

The match was won 3-1 by Drogheda.

References

Cup Final
League of Ireland Cup finals
Final
League Of Ireland Cup Final 2012
League Of Ireland Cup Final 2012
League Of Ireland Cup Final